Carlos Alberto Basombrío Ormeño (born 21 October 1971 in Lima) is a former Peruvian footballer.

Club career
Basombrío spent most of his career playing for clubs in Peru, including Alianza Lima and Juan Aurich. He also had a spell with Veria in the Greek Super League.

International career
Basombrío made one appearance for the senior Peru national football team, a friendly against Colombia on 3 May 1994.

References

1971 births
Living people
Footballers from Lima
Association football defenders
Peruvian footballers
Peru international footballers
Club Alianza Lima footballers
Veria F.C. players
Juan Aurich footballers
Peruvian expatriate footballers
Expatriate footballers in Greece